Timirovo (Timer) is a rural locality (a village) in Michurinsky Selsoviet, Sharansky District, Bashkortostan, Russia. The population was 83 as of 2010. There is 1 street.

Geography 
Timirovo is located 23 km northeast of Sharan (the district's administrative centre) by road. Novoyumashevo is the nearest rural locality.

References 

Rural localities in Sharansky District